Lohfelderfähre is a district of Bad Honnef, Germany. It evolved around the Eastern bank pier of the car ferry across the Rhine between Bad Honnef and Rolandseck.

Bad Honnef